The 2017–18 Michigan State Spartans women's basketball team represented Michigan State University during the 2017–18 NCAA Division I women's basketball season. The Spartans, led by 11th-year head coach Suzy Merchant, played their home games at the Breslin Center in East Lansing, Michigan as members of the Big Ten Conference. They finished the season 19–14, 7–9 in Big Ten play to finish in a tie for ninth place. They lost in the second round of the Big Ten women's tournament to Indiana. They received an at-large bid to the Women's National Invitation Tournament where they defeated Cincinnati and Toledo before losing to South Dakota in the third round.

Previous season 
The Spartans finished the 2016–17 season 21–12, 9–7 in Big Ten play to finish in a tie for sixth place. In the Big Ten tournament, they beat Wisconsin and Michigan before losing in the semifinals to Maryland. They received an at-large bid to the NCAA tournament as a No. 8 seed where the lost in the First Round to Arizona State.

Roster

Schedule and results

|-
!colspan=9 style=| Exhibition

|-
!colspan=9 style=| Non-conference regular season

|-
!colspan=9 style=| Big Ten regular season

|-
!colspan=9 style=|Big Ten tournament

|-
!colspan=9 style=|WNIT

Rankings
2017–18 NCAA Division I women's basketball rankings

See also
2017–18 Michigan State Spartans men's basketball team

References

Michigan State Spartans women's basketball seasons
Michigan State
Michigan